The Great Escape of Leslie Magnafuzz is the third studio album by American psychedelic rock band Radio Moscow. Released on October 11, 2011, it was recorded, mixed and mastered at California's Prairie Sun Recording Studios, produced by frontman Parker Griggs.

Reception

A reviewer identified as the Barman from i94bar.com describes Radio Moscow as "an old-style power trio with an overload of psychedelic headspace, structured around guitarist Parker Griggs whose exemplary six-string work carves sonic holes."  He goes on to describe "The Great Escape of Lesilie Magnafuzz" as an album filled to the brim with "spiraling guitar lines and warm yet slightly disembodied Griggs vocals run through bubbling bass-lines and drumming that's all over the kit but firmly anchored to the floor."  While wrapping up his review, the Barman commends Radio Moscow for tapping into "a motherlode of bluesy, heavy but nimble psych", adding that it's "no wonder they've enjoyed the patronage of The Black Keys."

Track listing

Personnel
Radio Moscow
Parker Griggs – vocals, guitars, drums, percussion, harmonica, production, mixing, illustrations
Zach Anderson – bass
Additional personnel
Jason D'Ottavio – engineering, mixing
Tim Gennert – mastering
Allison Cobb – artwork
Geoff Crowe – layout

References

Radio Moscow (band) albums
2011 albums
Alive Naturalsound Records albums